Verónika con K (born Nicanora Verónica Hernández Ávila on February 14, 1950) is a Mexican actress, singer and TV hostess.

Verónika con K was born in Santo Domingo, Oaxaca, Mexico. She made her debut in the 1975 film Satânico Pandemonium. She also appeared in the films El guía de las turistas, ¡Oye Salomé!, La mujer del puerto and Hembras de tierra caliente.

In 1989 she appeared in a children's TV series, Carrusel, as Belén. She was also in Marisol, El Privilegio de Amar, Abrázame muy fuerte and Mariana de la noche.

In 2016 Verónika con K celebrated 45 years in show business.

In 2017 she returned to telenovelas in El vuelo de la victoria as Chencha, mother of Paulina Goto.

Filmography

References

External links 
 

1953 births
Living people
Mexican telenovela actresses
Mexican television actresses
Mexican film actresses
Mexican women singers
Mexican television presenters
Mexican television talk show hosts
Actresses from Oaxaca
Singers from Oaxaca
20th-century Mexican actresses
21st-century Mexican actresses
People from Santo Domingo
Mexican women television presenters